The 2017–18 UEFA Women's Champions League knockout phase began on 4 October 2017 and ended on 24 May 2018 with the final at the Valeriy Lobanovskyi Dynamo Stadium in Kyiv, Ukraine, to decide the champions of the 2017–18 UEFA Women's Champions League. A total of 32 teams competed in the knockout phase.

Times from 29 October 2017 up to 24 March 2018 (both legs of round of 16 and first legs of quarter-finals) are CET (UTC+1), all other times are CEST (UTC+2).

Round and draw dates
The schedule of the knockout phase was as follows (all draws are held at the UEFA headquarters in Nyon, Switzerland).

Format
The knockout phase involved 32 teams: 21 teams which received a bye, and the 11 teams which advanced from the qualifying round (ten group winners and the best runners-up).

In the knockout phase, teams played against each other over two legs on a home-and-away basis, except for the one-match final. If the aggregate score was tied after full time of the second leg, the away goals rule was used to decide the winners. If still tied, extra time is played. The away goals rule was again used after extra time, i.e. if there are goals scored during extra time and the aggregate score was still tied after extra time, the away team of the second leg advanced by virtue of more away goals scored. If no goals were scored during extra time, the match was decided by penalty shoot-out. In the final, which was played as a single match, if the score was tied after full time, extra time was played, followed by penalty shoot-out if the score was still tied after extra time.

The mechanism of the draws for each round is as follows:
In the draw for the round of 32, the sixteen teams with the highest UEFA club coefficients were seeded (with the title holders being the automatic top seed), and the other sixteen teams are unseeded. The seeded teams are drawn against the unseeded teams, with the seeded teams hosting the second leg. Teams from the same association or the same qualifying round group cannot be drawn against each other.
In the draw for the round of 16, the eight teams with the highest UEFA club coefficients are seeded (with the title holders being the automatic top seed should they qualify), and the other eight teams are unseeded. The seeded teams are drawn against the unseeded teams, with the order of legs decided by draw. Teams from the same association cannot be drawn against each other.
In the draws for the quarter-finals and semi-finals, there are no seedings, and teams from the same association can be drawn against each other. As the draws for the quarter-finals and semi-finals are held together before the quarter-finals are played, the identity of the teams in the semi-finals are not known at the time of the draw. A draw is also held to determine the "home" team for the final (for administrative purposes as it is played at a neutral venue).

Qualified teams
Below are the 32 teams which participated in the knockout phase (with their 2017 UEFA club coefficients, which took into account their performance in European competitions from 2012–13 to 2016–17 plus 33% of their association coefficient from the same time span).

Bracket
The full bracket was fixed after the quarter-final and semi-final draws.

Round of 32

The draw for the round of 32 was held on 1 September 2017, 13:30 CEST, at the UEFA headquarters in Nyon, Switzerland.

Notes

Overview

The first legs were played on 4 and 5 October, and the second legs on 11 and 12 October 2017.

|}

Matches

Stjarnan won 5–1 on aggregate.

Fiorentina won 2–1 on aggregate.

Linköping won 4–0 on aggregate.

Montpellier won 2–1 on aggregate.

4–4 on aggregate. BIIK Kazygurt won on away goals.

Gintra Universitetas won 3–2 on aggregate.

Wolfsburg won 15–2 on aggregate.

Lillestrøm won 3–1 on aggregate.

Brescia won 2–1 on aggregate.

Manchester City won 6–0 on aggregate.

2–2 on aggregate. Chelsea won on away goals.

Slavia Praha won 7–4 on aggregate.

Lyon won 14–0 on aggregate.

Sparta Praha won 8–0 on aggregate.

Rosengård won 5–0 on aggregate.

Barcelona won 6–0 on aggregate.

Round of 16

The draw for the round of 16 was held on 16 October 2017, 13:30 CEST, at the UEFA headquarters in Nyon, Switzerland.

Overview

The first legs were played on 8 and 9 November and the second legs on 15 and 16 November 2017.

|}

Matches

Linköping won 4–1 on aggregate.

Barcelona won 9–0 on aggregate.

Chelsea won 4–0 on aggregate.

Manchester City won 7–1 on aggregate.

Montpellier won 9–2 on aggregate.

Lyon won 16–0 on aggregate.

Wolfsburg won 7–3 on aggregate.

Slavia Praha won 2–1 on aggregate.

Quarter-finals

The draw for the quarter-finals was held on 24 November 2017, 13:30 CET, at the UEFA headquarters in Nyon, Switzerland.

Overview

The first legs were played on 21 and 22 March, and the second legs on 28 March 2018.

|}

Matches

Chelsea won 5–1 on aggregate.

Wolfsburg won 6–1 on aggregate.

Manchester City won 7–3 on aggregate.

Lyon won 3–1 on aggregate.

Semi-finals

The draw for the semi-finals was held on 24 November 2017, 13:30 CET (together with the quarter-final draw), at the UEFA headquarters in Nyon, Switzerland.

Overview

The first legs were played on 22 April, and the second legs on 29 April 2018.

|}

Matches

Wolfsburg won 5–1 on aggregate.

Lyon won 1–0 on aggregate.

Final

The final was played at the Valeriy Lobanovskyi Dynamo Stadium in Kyiv on 24 May 2018. The "home" team for the final (for administrative purposes) was determined by an additional draw held after the quarter-final and semi-final draws.

References

External links
Official website
UEFA Women's Champions League history: 2017/18

2
October 2017 sports events in Europe
November 2017 sports events in Europe
March 2018 sports events in Europe
April 2018 sports events in Europe
May 2018 sports events in Europe